Bell and another v The Tavistock and Portman NHS Foundation Trust, more often called simply Bell v Tavistock, was a case before the Court of Appeal (England and Wales) on the question of whether puberty blockers could be prescribed to under-18s with gender dysphoria. It was related to Gillick competence, the legal principle governing under what circumstances under-16s can consent to medical treatment in their own right. By contrast, people aged 16 or older were presumed to have the ability to consent to medical treatment (Gillick did not apply).

The High Court (Administrative Court) ruling, which was overturned on appeal, said that it was unlikely that a child under the age of 16 could be Gillick competent to consent to puberty blocking treatment. The court also said that "[in] respect of young persons aged 16 and over ... we recognise that clinicians may well regard these as cases where the authorisation of the court should be sought prior to commencing the clinical treatment".

In September 2021, the Court of Appeal overturned the High Court judgment, and ruled that the High Court should not have issued guidance on the Gillick test and puberty blockers, because that court should have dismissed the case when it ruled that the Tavistock guidance was lawful. The Court of Appeal said that "it was for clinicians rather than the court to decide on competence" to consent to receive puberty blockers.

In a separate case (AB v CD and others), the High Court ruled that parents are allowed to give consent on behalf of their children to receive puberty blockers without having to gain a judge's approval.

Background 
In October 2019, a legal complaint (a request for  judicial review) was lodged against the NHS Gender Identity Development Service (GIDS) at its satellite site in Leeds. The suit was brought by "Mrs. A", the mother of a 15-year-old patient on the GIDS waiting list, and Sue Evans, a former nurse at the Leeds GIDS satellite site. It alleged that advice around hormone therapy was "potentially misleading" and that true informed consent could not be given under such circumstances. The suit described hormone therapy as "experimental" and stated that there was "robust evidence" to show long-lasting medical effects of hormone therapy. The lawyer representing the claimants said the lawsuit would be "pressing the case of Gillick to its breaking point".

Some time after January 2020, Evans passed on her role as complainant to Keira Bell (referred to in court documents as Quincy Bell) "who was prescribed puberty blockers by GIDS when she was 16, thus her name is included in the case label. Bell had a double mastectomy aged 20, and now regrets transitioning, which has left her with 'no breasts, a deep voice, body hair, a beard[, and] affected sexual function'. She may well be infertile as a side effect of the drugs."

Bell in hindsight described her transition as being related to her mother's alcoholism, struggling with puberty, struggling with being a lesbian, social isolation, and depression.

High Court judgment 
In the judgment delivered on 1 December 2020, which has now been quashed on appeal, the judges said that it was highly unlikely that a child aged 13 or less would be competent to give consent to the administration of puberty blockers, and that it was doubtful that 14 or 15 year olds could understand the long-term risks and consequences of this form of treatment. Where the young person is 16 or over, "we recognise that clinicians may well regard these as cases where the authorisation of the court should be sought prior to commencing the clinical treatment."

The Court said (126) "Where the decision is significant and life changing then there is a greater onus to ensure that the child understands and is able to weigh the information" and concluded:

Reactions to the High Court judgment 
A spokesperson for the Tavistock and Portman NHS Foundation Trust (the defendant in the suit) said it was disappointed in the decision and intended to appeal. Bell, one of the claimants, expressed approval of the judgment.

Mermaids, a UK charity for gender-variant and trans youth, described the ruling as a "potentially devastating blow to trans under-16s", and a "betrayal of trans young people".

The Bayswater Support Group, which describes itself as supporting "the parents of children with adolescent-onset gender dysphoria", welcomed the ruling.

The UK human rights groups Amnesty International UK and Liberty issued a joint statement expressing disappointment in the judgment and concern "not only for what this means for the health and well-being of trans young people, but the wider implications this will have on the rights of children and young people of all genders, particularly on consent and bodily autonomy."

In the immediate aftermath of the judgment, there were many reports of existing patients at GIDS having their treatment abruptly cut off, and that even care for patients over the age of 16 was being affected.

Sandra Duffy, writing in Irish Legal News said "Through the declaration and guidance issued in the [High Court] judgment, it set a near-impossibly high standard for competence to consent, including a requirement to understand the effects of cross-sex hormones – a treatment which is only prescribed to adults."

Alistair Robertson, a solicitor who advised Tavistock and Portman NHS Foundation Trust in the appeal said "We were disappointed with the Divisional Court's judgment. Despite making no finding of unlawfulness, the court still made a declaration of what, precisely, a child had to be able to weigh up before consenting to treatment with puberty blockers, and gave very strong 'guidance' on whether children in particular age groups would be able to give such consent."

Appeal 
Leave to appeal against the decision of the High Court was granted in January 2021. The appeal was heard on 23 and 24 June 2021 by the Lord Burnett of Maldon (Lord Chief Justice), Sir Geoffrey Vos (Master of the Rolls) and Dame Eleanor King (Lady Justice of Appeal), and judgment was given on Friday 17 September.

The original decision was overturned by the Court of Appeal and the guidance on puberty blockers was quashed. The Court of Appeal ruled that the High Court should not have issued guidance on the Gillick test and puberty blockers because that court should have dismissed the case when it ruled that the Tavistock guidance was lawful. The Court of Appeal found that it was "for clinicians to exercise their judgement" in relation to puberty blocking treatment.

The Supreme Court of the United Kingdom refused Bell's application for permission to appeal on 28 April 2022, with the reason that it did “not raise an arguable point of law.”

Reactions to the appeal 

Alistair Robertson, a solicitor who advised the Tavistock and Portman NHS Foundation Trust, said going into the appeal "Our strategy had to be to focus the courts on the specific legal issues raised and away from the moral controversy around the treatment of children for gender dysphoria."

Following the appeal Helen Marshall, Chief Executive of Brook, one of the appellants against the original ruling, expressed delight with the appeal judgment and said "By confirming that clinicians are able to use their professional judgement to evaluate an individual young person's capacity to consent to the use of puberty blockers, today's judgment crucially upholds the principle of Gillick competence which underpins practice across health, social care and many other areas of work with young people."

Describing the appeal judgment, Sandra Duffy of Irish Legal News said "The Court of Appeal disagreed profoundly with the findings of the Divisional [High] Court on both evidentiary and legal bases. Its decision to overturn found that the Divisional Court had relied on flawed expert evidence (Bell 2, 38), 'implied factual findings that the Divisional Court was not equipped to make' (65), and was incorrect in issuing both its declaration of law and its guidance on the application (84 and 89)" and highlighted the importance of "the Court of Appeal's finding that Gillick competence applies to puberty blockers in the same way that it would to any other medical decision."

Marina Wheeler , reacting to the appeal, said "In essence, the Court of Appeal found that the judges below [in the High Court] had stepped into the shoes of clinicians: it is 'for doctors to decide on competence not judges adding "As figures before the Court show, treatment for gender dysphoria among children is increasing: in 2009 there were 97 referrals to the Tavistock clinic; in 2019 there were 2,519. Given these figures, Ms Bell is unlikely to be the only young person who has changed their mind about treatment. If this is right, a clinical negligence claim is just a matter of time. Unlike proceedings for judicial review, that will provide a forum where the court is required to make factual findings, form judgments about clinical practice, and resolve disputes between experts. On that occasion, the judges will have to decide."

AB v CD and others 
AB v CD and others is a separate case involving the Tavistock & Portman NHS Foundation Trust, on the related matter of whether parents can give legal consent to their child receiving puberty blockers. In a judgment issued on 26 March 2021, the High Court ruled that parents are able to give such consent "save where the parents are seeking to override the decision of the child" [para 114 of the judgment]. The case does not overrule, nor have any legal effect on, the judgment in Bell v Tavistock; the ruling reads [para 9] "Nothing that is said below is intended to depart, to even the smallest extent, from anything that was said in Bell."

Summary of judgments

References 

High Court of Justice cases
Transgender case law in the United Kingdom
Transgender and medicine
2021 in LGBT history
History of women in the United Kingdom
2021 in women's history